Kurt Helbig (June 28, 1901, Plauen – January 30, 1975) was a German weightlifter who competed in the 1928 Summer Olympics.

He died in Berlin.

In 1928 he won the gold medal in the lightweight class.

References
 

1901 births
1975 deaths
People from Plauen
German male weightlifters
Olympic weightlifters of Germany
Weightlifters at the 1928 Summer Olympics
Olympic gold medalists for Germany
World record setters in weightlifting
Olympic medalists in weightlifting
Medalists at the 1928 Summer Olympics
Sportspeople from Saxony